Zaniemyśl  is a village in Środa Wielkopolska County, Greater Poland Voivodeship, in west-central Poland. It is the seat of the gmina (administrative district) called Gmina Zaniemyśl. The village has a population of 2,200.

Zaniemyśl lies next to a series of lakes, making it a popular tourist destination. There is also a steam railway running between Zaniemyśl and Środa Wielkopolska. This is the oldest steam railway in Poland.

References

Villages in Środa Wielkopolska County